Pierce Arrow Factory Complex is a national historic district consisting of the former Pierce-Arrow automobile factory located at Buffalo in Erie County, New York.

History 
It was designed by Albert Kahn in about 1906 and served as the headquarters and production facility for Pierce-Arrow automobiles until 1938. Since then, the complex has been subdivided over the years to provide affordable space for many small companies and organizations. At one time local department store chain AM&A's operated a furniture warehouse in part of the complex.

It was listed on the National Register of Historic Places in 1974.

Construction and features 
Located over a  site, it consists of a three-story,  Administration Building and an assortment of automobile manufacturing and assembly related structures. The buildings are principally constructed of reinforced concrete, and the Administration Building is considered one of the two earliest fully-realized examples of the Daylight Factory industrial architecture style (the other being the Packard Automotive Plant in Detroit).

References

External links
Pierce Arrow Factory Complex - U.S. National Register of Historic Places on Waymarking.com
Pierce Arrow Factory, Elmwood Avenue - Western New York Heritage Press website

Buildings and structures in Buffalo, New York
Motor vehicle assembly plants in New York (state)
Industrial buildings and structures on the National Register of Historic Places in New York (state)
Historic districts in Buffalo, New York
Historic districts on the National Register of Historic Places in New York (state)
National Register of Historic Places in Buffalo, New York
Motor vehicle manufacturing plants on the National Register of Historic Places
Transportation buildings and structures on the National Register of Historic Places in New York (state)
Factory Complex
Mill architecture